Avengers: The Initiative is a comic book series from Marvel Comics. Written by Dan Slott and Christos Gage with artwork initially by Stefano Caselli, Steve Uy and Harvey Tolibao, the series handles the aftermath of Marvel's "Civil War" storyline (however, it should not be confused with "The Initiative" a banner running across Marvel books from Feb. 2007 to May 2007, similar to Marvel's earlier "Decimation" banner after the "House of M" storyline, or the Civil War: The Initiative special by Brian Michael Bendis). A preview of the title was shown in Civil War: The Initiative.

Publication history 
The first issue of Avengers: The Initiative was released on 4 April 2007. The tagline initially used in solicitations was "Marvel's Army of Super Heroes just became a Super Hero Army".

The series was originally solicited as a six issue limited series, but prior to the publication of the first issue, Marvel announced that this had changed and that Avengers: The Initiative would become an ongoing series, the third regularly published 'Avengers' title from 2007 onwards, after The New Avengers and The Mighty Avengers.

Issues #20-22 handled "Dark Reign", the aftermath to Secret Invasion, and Christos Gage moved to full writing duties.

The series was cancelled after Avengers: The Initiative #35 (April 2010), at the conclusion of the "Siege" storyline and replaced by Avengers Academy.

Fictional history

First recruit group
In the aftermath of the Civil War, the pro-registration side stood victorious and had launched the Fifty State Initiative which called for one S.H.I.E.L.D.-sponsored superhero team for each state. The series focused on the training facility at Camp Hammond, in Stamford, Connecticut.

The first group of young heroes has been sent to hero boot camp in Stamford, the site of the explosion that launched the whole Civil War. During the first day's training, Trauma, a shapeshifter, loses control of his power and causes Armory to have a panic attack. She accidentally shoots MVP, who was trying to save Cloud 9. Pym and Gyrich agree to conceal the death and expel Armory, but first amputate her alien weaponry, since she will be an unregistered super. As the young heroes finish the obstacle course, Trauma loses control of his transformation again, first feeding off of Cloud 9's guilt at being responsible for MVP's death, and then transforming into an image of a beaten and bloody Janet Van Dyne when Yellowjacket (Henry Pym) attempts to intervene. As Justice and Gauntlet clean up the situation, Pym is called to the lab where Baron Von Blitzschlag informs him and Henry Peter Gyrich of MVP's anatomy; instead of being enhanced by the Super Soldier Serum as everyone believed, he is actually an "Übermensch", the ultimate human specimen. As Blitzschlag and Gyrich laud the benefits of such a test subject, Pym again has a crisis of conscience, only enhanced when the German scientist recounts his past "villainous" acts (such as the creation of Ultron) and remarks "I am your greatest fan."

A crisis over Texas occurs involving the President and HYDRA. Cloud 9, Komodo, Hardball, Gauntlet, War Machine, Justice and Yellowjacket all arrive on the scene (with Hardball, Gauntlet and Komodo donning jet packs) Cloud 9 is revealed as the best marksman of the bunch when she receives a pulse rifle, but further feel guilt when she blows up a fighter jet and the pilot doesn't eject.

Hardball speaks to Komodo about Justice apparently having learned of MVP's fate. While he talks, he turns to see not Komodo but a strange girl sleeping next to him. Komodo is upset that her identity was revealed. Spider-Man battles the duo. He quickly incapacitates War Machine with a blast of webbing that shuts down his armor, but not before War Machine mysteriously states that even though Spider-Man will be stripped of his powers, another Spider-Man will exist. While Komodo fares much better, Spider-Man's wit and a threat that her failure will rcauseher losing her powers helps him defeat her and slip away easily.

A mysterious third party, which War Machine calls "Red Team" and which has been cloaked during the fight, is revealed to be a group of people in duplicate versions of Tony Stark's Spider-Man armor. The story ends with Komodo's desperate plea not to be stripped of her powers, as she dislikes being normal and considers her other self to be a nobody.

World War Hulk

The recruits are ordered to stay away from the fighting, but to still help with evacuation efforts. Rage and several other recruits disobey the direct order and go to help the Avengers. They are quickly dispatched by Hulk's Warbound and imprisoned in Madison Square Garden. Gyrich fears the political fallout, so he orders his Shadow Initiative to rescue only the six missing recruits. This team comprises Bengal, Trauma, Constrictor, Mutant Zero, and the Scarlet Spiders. Hulk eventually discovers the team and Trauma attempts to access Hulk's greatest fear, but Hulk tells him he fears nothing and nearly beats him to death.

During these events, Hardball is secretly recruited by HYDRA to steal nanotechnology. While in disguise, he sees MVP's body cryogenically frozen, but Justice and Cloud 9 claim to have seen him at his parents’ home. Sgt. Green is mysteriously attacked and can no longer train the recruits.

Second recruit group
Several new Initiative recruits arrive at Camp Hammond, including Ant-Man (Eric O'Grady), Crusader (Z'Reg), Melee, Geldoff, Dragon Lord (Tako Shamara), Geiger, Red Nine, and Diamondback. These recruits will mainly be trained by the instructor Taskmaster.

The results of the previous cloning's of MVP impressed Initiative administrators enough to fill places within the Fifty State Initiative with further clones of MVP.

Killed in Action
A new Michael Van Patrick clone is fitted with the Tactigon, Armory's former alien weapon, but goes on a rampage throughout the base under the new name "KIA" seeking revenge for MVP's death. The KIA clone causes destruction, killing Dragon Lord (Tako Shamara), Trauma (who is later revealed to have survived) and Van (one of the Scarlet Spiders). KIA also caused injury to many initiative trainees and staff like Thor Girl, Gauntlet, Constrictor and Crusader. He also killed eight S.H.I.E.L.D. agents on his rampage. He is eventually subdued when Cloud 9 uses the knowledge of Michael Van Patrick's crush on her to kiss him and fill him with gas. The reformed New Warriors and New Avengers can subdue him and mind wipe him with a device from Baron Von Blitzschlag.

First graduations
Some of the first instalment trainees made it to graduation. The graduating class and their assignments were:

 Cloud 9: Montana - Freedom Force
 Hardball: Nevada - Heavy Hitters
 Thor Girl: Georgia - The Cavalry
 Komodo: Arizona - Desert Stars
 Trauma: remains on base as a counselor
 Triathlon (now going by 3-D Man and sporting the costume of his namesake): Hawaii -Point Men
 Ultra Girl (now wearing Ms. Marvel's original costume): Georgia -The Cavalry

Justice, Debrii, Slapstick, Rage, MVP and the two remaining Scarlet Spiders left the Initiative to form Counter Force, described as a counter-initiative that will dedicate themselves to keeping the government program honest.

More recruits
Starting with issue #13, the series features new recruits that will join the squad assembled before the coming of KIA. They are: Annex, Prodigy, Gorilla Girl, Sunstreak, Batwing and Boulder.  Less enthusiastic than the first recruits, most of them with criminal records (except Butterball/Boulder who wanted to be there, and Batwing, who was just seeking a cure for his condition) they are there because their alternative to Camp Hammond is the Negative Zone prison (however, the criminal charges against all but Sunstreak appear to be limited to non-registration). Taskmaster quickly renames Boulder "Butterball" regarding his size. He has been challenged to make Butterball into a good soldier; but because of his invulnerability powers, his physical appearance could not be altered. The recruits break out of the camp because of boredom and decide to go to the beach where they drink and skinny dip, since they would be recognized anywhere else. Sunstreak attempts to have relations with Butterball, who refuses and takes their ride and heads back to the camp but encounters Constrictor, Taskmaster, War Machine and Yellowjacket. He lies, claiming to have gone AWOL alone. Although the recruits plan to use this distraction to sneak back on base, they instead help defeat Firebrand, King Cobra, Mister Hyde and Mauler, all of whom wanted revenge on the Taskmaster. Butterball washes out of the program when it is deemed he does not have the attitude to be a superhero. To ease his disappointment, Taskmaster and Constrictor allow him to take a picture that makes it look like he has defeated them.

Secret Invasion

The Revolutionary, a member of Pennsylvania's Liberteens, is actually a Skrull in disguise. He is part of a plot to put "a Skrull in every state" by infiltrating each superhero team of the Initiative. During Secret Invasion Crusader discovers that camp director Yellowjacket is actually a Skrull impostor; he almost tells the camp's counselor Trauma but changes his mind. When 3-D Man arrives in Camp Hammond to announce to everyone assembled that the Initiative has been infiltrated by Skrulls, Crusader fears he will be exposed as a Skrull despite his good intentions. Crusader uses the Freedom Ring to reverse the goggles' power so that they cause 3-D Man to see Crusader as human and all humans as Skrulls.

Later 'Yellowjacket-Skrull' gives orders to Gauntlet to dispatch the cadets to help the Young Avengers fight the Skrulls, and Proton is killed during the battle. The Skrulls defeat the cadets and Young Avengers, but then Nick Fury arrives with his "commandos." Meanwhile, Ant-Man (Eric O'Grady), the only cadet still on Camp Hammond, witnessed how "Yellowjacket" welcomed a Skrull commander to the base and attempts to learn of their secret plans. During the big fight against the Skrull army, Crusader, (a Skrull who lives on Earth and an Initiative cadet) fought for Earth.

After defeating a Skrull imposter looking like 'She-Thing', 3-D Man joined up with the Skrull Kill Krew and discovered that in every Initiative state team is one Skrull-imposter and killed them all. Komodo joined the team as well, and they then added her lover, Hardball. The Skrull Kill Crew thought they could not track through all the states on time, but then former Avenger Jocasta appeared with Devil-Slayer, who is a member of the Hawaiian Initiative team, the Point Men. Devil-Slayer's teleportation ability will aid them in killing all Skrull imposters within the Fifty State Initiative.

The group move on to other Initiative bases, killing the Skrull imposters. Delroy Garret's goggles also identify Equinox as a Skrull who is then killed by Cloud 9, who then joins their insurgency with Gravity. The Skrull then sends a broadcast throughout the world, telling their sleeper agents to activate themselves, which sows even more distrust among the remaining heroes. While in Philadelphia, the Revolutionary is revealed as a Skrull and defeated by Gravity and Hope. When they discover a fight between Thor Girl and Ultra Girl, Delroy's goggles identify Thor Girl as a Skrull. With help from Gravity, Delroy uses Thor Girl's own hammer to kill the Skrull imposter. Ant-Man escapes the Skrulls on the back of a Shock Trooper and reveals to the Kill Crew the Skrulls' last resort plan; to use all the Initiative bases to create a massive Negative Zone portal that will destroy the entire country. With six bases left, the Krew splits up, and uses the still-living heads of Moonstomp, Catwalk and Dice to help point out Skrulls. Devil-Slayer teleports them to the bases, but collapses under the strain.

The Initiative members combat their Skrull opponents, who have received their mission to activate themselves to start distrust among the teams. At the Battalion's HQ, Tigra, Ryder, and Cloud 9 fight a Skrull posing as Razorback. Hardball and Moonstomp help Action Pack fight a Skrull posing as Frog-Man. Gravity and Catwalk help the Great Lakes Avengers fight a Skrull posing as Grasshopper. Komodo and Riot help the Command fight a Skrull posing as Conquistador (who assumed a Skrull/Devil Dinosaur-like form). Dice and Jocasta fight their way through activists to get to the Skrull posing as Skyhawk who succeeds in his part of the mission. Delroy Garrett and Ant-Man join the Rangers in fighting a Skrull that posed as Red Wolf's wolf companion Lobo. After it is shot by Shooting Star, a crowd uprising occurred when Delroy's goggles identify some of the crowd members as Skrulls. Delroy's goggles are hit by a thrown rock, giving Delroy's allies a complicated time understanding who's a Skrull and who is not. During the struggle, Delroy discovers he can see who is a Skrull without his goggles since the Tri-Force energy is inside him. This turns the tides against those Skrulls disguised as crowd members. During the fights across the USA, Spinner and Whiz-Kid both apparently die in various fights. At the final fight at Camp Hammond, Crusader kills Criti Noll, the Yellow Jacket imposter, and then 3-D Man shoots Crusader (who hid his Skrull heritage from the others but was fighting for Earth). Before he disappeared, Crusader stated he wished "it could've ended differently".

Dark Reign

Following the aftermath of the Secret Invasion, the Fifty-State Initiative is shut down and the Thunderbolts Initiative is established when Norman Osborn takes over.

Those that had been replaced by Skrulls alongside Alicia Masters meet with Doc Samson at Camp Hammond as part of a support group. While noting the hostilities of Red Nine, Annex, Geiger, Batwing, and Prodigy over the shooting of Crusader, Delroy states he is leaving the Initiative and joining up with Ryder to hunt down any Skrulls still hiding out on Earth. Taskmaster confronts Mutant Zero and discovers that she is really Typhoid Mary. The Gauntlet takes control as head of Camp Hammond because of his position as the highest-ranking officer left. Despite an offer by the Gauntlet, Hank Pym leaves the camp, because he "was never here".

Next some of the latest recruits graduated and were assigned to different teams. Batwing became a member of the Shadow Initiative, Melee was assigned to additional training to become a Camp Hammond instructor for martial arts, Annex became a member of the Mavericks (New Mexico) and Red Nine of The Cavalry, Georgia. Geiger also graduated, but it was not mentioned where she was to be stationed. Camp Hammond instructor Stingray became the new leader of the Point Men (Hawaii). Because of their villainous past, Sunstreak and Prodigy were not assigned to an Initiative State Team yet, but have to remain under training at Camp Hammond. Since Gorilla Girl felt she was typical cannon fodder, she went home and was listed as a reserve member.

Meanwhile, Baron von Blitzschlag encountered the Thor-clone (now dubbed Ragnarok), which was reactivated by a failsafe programmed by the Hank Pym Skrull, which required his access code to keep him contained. The clone apparently killed the Baron within a couple of minutes. Thereafter, Ragnarok was attacked by Thor-Girl, who he beat after a long and heavy fight above Camp Hammond. Even a trick of Trauma (posing as the real Thor) was ineffective. Outside Gorilla Girl, on her way back home, escaped from her car and opposed Ragnarok. As she was about to lose the fight, a light appeared. The former New Warriors (now called Counter Force) appeared, ready to fight.

The fight with the Thor clone rages on as Justice tells Ragnarok that he had worked with the REAL Thor and that Ragnarok is unworthy of that name. After Ragnarok knocks out Rage and Slapstick, Debrii has the Scarlet Spiders hack into Ragnarok. However, Ragnarok kills Michael the Scarlet Spider. Ragnarok is about to vanquish Von Blitzschlag with pure physical force when the crafty Baron dismisses the notion as futile. He states that while he could easily kill everyone here and everyone in the world, he would not change the fact he is, in fact, an android-clone based on the real Thor. Unconvinced, Ragnarok is shown proof that such methods are possible when one of the Scarlet Spiders reveals he and his "brothers" are all clones as well. Blitzschlag tells Ragnarok that the real Thor is living in Asgard, which is now physically in the realm of Earth (or Midgard) where it is floating above Oklahoma. Ragnarok resolves it matters not whether he is or isn't a clone, but that his warrior's resolve is true. He flies off to presumably confront Thor and his fellow Asgardians.

Following Ragnarok's attack, Counter Force buries Michael Van Patrick's body and confesses to the world about Michael's death and the clones. This gives Norman Osborn the opportunity to shut down Camp Hammond.

Following the Taskmaster's fight with Hardball's HYDRA faction, Norman Osborn hires him to help run the camp.

Norman Osborn announces to the media that he has reopened the Initiative training camp under the name Camp H.A.M.M.E.R. in New Mexico away from any populated areas. Osborn then moulds the Initiative to match his own vision. He transfers Gravity to the Great Lakes Avengers with Prodigy taking his place as leader of the Heavy Hitters. He assigns the Force of Nature to Oregon, the U-Foes to North Carolina, the Psionex to Maryland and the Women Warriors to Delaware. Penance, brainwashed at Osborn's command, is sent to Camp H.A.M.M.E.R. to assist Taskmaster. Gauntlet and Tigra leave their posts at the Initiative and join with the New Warriors to form the Avengers Resistance against Norman Osborn's new regime. Trauma is kept on as the Camp H.A.M.M.E.R. counselor, against his will with the promise that if he leaves, his mother will be killed, but if he stays, they will cure her insanity. It is later revealed that he is actually the son of Nightmare, who corrupts his son's body and attacks the base. Most of the heroes are stunned by their fears, but Taskmaster revives a fallen Penance, who has regained all his memories and no longer has any fears and regrets. Immune to Nightmare, he frees Trauma and Nightmare is banished.

Osborn is pleased with Taskmaster and invites him to join the Cabal, while Constrictor is shocked to learn Diamondback is a double agent to the Avengers Resistance. He admits he does not care since he is in love with her. Osborn reveals to Taskmaster that the next mission will be to lay Siege on Asgard. After Osborn's treachery is exposed, the Superhuman Registration Act has been abolished.

During the Fear Itself storyline, the Initiative teams have gotten back together where their representatives meet with Prodigy in Washington, DC to discuss the hammers that the Serpent has brought to Earth.

Shadow Initiative

It has been revealed that there is a special "black ops" team within the Initiative, answerable only to Henry Gyrich and known as the Shadow Initiative. This team comprises Bengal, Trauma, Constrictor, Mutant Zero, and, for a time, the Scarlet Spiders.

This Shadow Initiative was sent out by Henry Gyrich to free the Initiative members captured by the Hulk's Warbound; Rage, Cloud 9, Ultra Girl, Thor Girl, Slapstick and Hardball; this assignment showed Bengal to be a perfect field leader of this Shadow Initiative. The black ops group successfully rescues these captured trainees, while Trauma, their "secret weapon" tries to use his powers to scare the Hulk (becoming the Abomination, Juggernaut, Brian Banner, and Bruce Banner). He cannot beat the Hulk, and the Hulk beats him into unconsciousness, leaving Terrance alive to pass the message on to the others. Trauma is later seen recuperating in the Initiative's medical bay.

It is later revealed that the Scarlet Spiders are clones of Michael Van Patrick (MVP), a deceased initiative recruit accidentally killed. The Scarlet Spiders are later taken off the Black Ops team after revealing themselves to the public and placed with the other trainees.

Gyrich called them to protect him from K.I.A., but they lost and one of the Scarlet Spiders was killed, and Constrictor was badly maimed. Mutant Zero saved Gyrich and Scarlet Spiders continued the battle for their brother. After KIA was defeated, the two remaining Scarlet Spiders left the Initiative to join Counter Force, a team of former New Warriors led by Justice, while Constrictor was healed with two bionic hands.

During Secret Invasion, the Shadow Initiative stayed at Camp Hammond while most others at Camp Hammond went to fight the Skrulls in New York. Later the Skrulls used Camp Hammond as a base, which Ant-Man discovers, having stayed behind out of cowardice. The Shadow Initiative tries to assassinate the Skrull Queen Veranke, but is defeated and captured, except for Ant-Man. During this story it was revealed Mutant Zero is a red-haired woman.

After Secret Invasion, Taskmaster is added by Gauntlet to the Black-Ops team as their field leader. The Shadow Initiative, joined by Komodo, is assigned to take down a HYDRA cell, led by former Initiative member Hardball, in Madripoor. After the mission briefing, Taskmaster senses something familiar about Mutant Zero and later confronts her. A fight ensues and Taskmaster goads Mutant Zero into revealing her true identity: Mary Walker.

The Shadow Initiative is dropped into Madripoor by S.H.I.E.L.D. agents. During the mission, Taskmaster, Constrictor, Bengal, Typhoid Mary and Komodo are confronted by Hardball, Scorpion and HYDRA agents. Komodo is shot with HYDRA changed S.P.I.N technology by Hardball, forcing the Shadow Initiative into a hasty retreat. They escape, but are forced to leave a depowered Komodo behind. Taskmaster calls off the mission in the light of HYDRA gaining S.P.I.N Tech. But before they can pull out of Madripoor, the Shadow Initiative learns that S.H.I.E.L.D. has since become defunct, leaving the team alone with no way out of the country. They then infiltrate HYDRA, send a wire for help, and continue their mission to capture Hardball and shutdown the HYDRA cell. During the fight, Typhoid Mary relapses into her dangerous personality and escapes, leaving the rest of the Shadow Initiative in trouble. But then help arrives as Ant-Man and H.A.M.M.E.R. agents. Hardball then surrenders himself to the Constrictor, citing that everything that he has done was to protect Komodo. Constrictor understands, given his similar relationship with his daughter, and arrests Hardball.

Batwing graduates from the Initiative programme and is assigned to the Shadow Initiative.

Dark Reign
Butterball, Ringer, Doctor Sax, Johnny Guitar, Badd Axe, Firearms, Slaughter Boy and Heavy Mettle (Barracuda, Blackwing, Riot, Stronghold and Warbow) join Bengal, Komodo and Batwing in a new look Shadow Initiative. But as Norman Osborn already has a covert team in the shape of the Thunderbolts, the Shadow Initiative is turned into a "cannon fodder" unit, purposely sent on suicide missions, a fact that is hidden from the Shadow Initiative members.

Before their first mission to take back Prison 42 from Blastaar's alien forces, Johnny Guitar overhears the Taskmaster and learns the Shadow Initiative's true purpose. After some consideration, he bravely goes through with the mission. But not before guaranteeing his family's compensation in the event of his death and deliberately injuring his best friend, Doctor Sax, washing him out of the Initiative and saving his life. During the siege to take back Prison 42, along with several other members of the Shadow Initiative, Johnny Guitar is killed in action. Also confirmed to be killed are Blackwing, Slaughterboy, and Firearms. Bengal, Komodo, Batwing, Butterball and the surviving members of the Shadow Initiative fight against the odds and take back prison 42. They are aided by Hardball, a Prison 42 detainee forced to join Blastaar's army, who suggests to Dr. Arthur Nagan that they should release Dragon Man, knowing that the creature would side with Komodo. Taskmaster, Constrictor, Penance, Living Laser and Scorcher arrive shortly after to finish the enemy. Bengal and the rest of the Shadow Initiative realized the true nature of their mission.

Osborn orders members of the Shadow Initiative (Badd Axe, Ringer, and Warbow) to attack the Heavy Hitters after they secede from the Initiative. They help the other Initiative teams to defeat and capture the Heavy Hitters' leader, Prodigy. The attack upon Prodigy is then uploaded onto YouTube by Telemetry and Non-Stop to show the aggressive tactics employed by Osborn.

Siege
Several members of the Shadow Initiative take part in the invasion of Asgard. During the battle, the Warbow of Heavy Mettle is apparently killed by a hail of arrows. Badd Axe and Ringer are among those defending Camp HAMMER when it is invaded by the Avengers Resistance.

Characters

List of teams by state
 
{| class="wikitable" width=100%
!width=15%| State
!width=20%| Team Name
!width=25%| 1st Appearance
!width=40%| Members
|-
|Alaska
|Unnamed
| Patsy Walker: Hellcat #1
|Hellcat
|-
|Arizona
|Desert Stars
|Avengers: The Initiative #16
|Two-Gun Kid (leader), Komodo, Johnny Cool, Supermax, Blacksmith (secretly a Skrull infiltrator)
|-
|Arkansas
|Battalion
|Avengers: The Initiative #19
|Tigra, Razorback (was briefly replaced by a Skrull infiltrator)
|- 
|California
|The Order
| Civil War #6
|Member List
|-
|Colorado
|Thunderbolts
|Thunderbolts #110 (as Initiative team)
|Member List
|-
|Connecticut
|Camp Hammond Staff & Trainees
|Avengers: The Initiative #1
|See List of Avengers: The Initiative characters
|-
|Delaware
|The Women Warriors
|Avengers: The Initiative #26
|Asp, Black Mamba, Diamondback, Quicksand, Skein
|-
|Florida
|The Command
|Marvel Zombies vol. 3 #1
|Jennifer Kale, Wundarr the Aquarian, Siege, Conquistador. Conquistador (was briefly replaced by a Skrull)
|-
|Georgia
|Cavalry
|Avengers: The Initiative #18
|Stunt-Master, Crime-Buster, Red Nine, Thor Girl, Ultra Girl
|-
|Hawaii
|Point Men
|Avengers: The Initiative #14
|Stingray, Devil-Slayer, Star Sign, Paydirt, Magnitude (revealed to be a Skrull infiltrator), Delroy Garrett (former)
|-
|Illinois
|Spaceknights
|Named in Civil War #6
|Unknown
|-
|Iowa
|Force Works
|Named in Civil War #6 
|Cybermancer
|-
|Kansas
|Harvesters
|Marvel Zombies Supreme #2
|Pioneer, Grain Belt, Topeka, Meadowlark, Sunflower
|-
|Kentucky
|Action Pack
|Avengers: The Initiative #7
|Vox (leader), Prima Donna, Frog-Man (briefly replaced by a Skrull)
|-
|Maryland
|Psionex
|Avengers: The Initiative #26
|Member List
|-
|Montana
|Freedom Force
|Avengers: The Initiative #12
|Member List
|-
|Nebraska
|Unnamed group
|The Invincible Iron Man vol. 4 #24
|Captain Ultra (Leader), Gadget (Deceased), Paragon (Cooper Roth) (Deceased)<ref>In The Invincible Iron Man vol. 4 #24</ref>
|-
|Nevada
|Heavy Hitters
|Avengers: The Initiative #17
|Hardball, Prodigy, Gravity, Nonstop, Telemetry, Outback
|-
|New Jersey
|Defenders
|The Last Defenders #1
|Member List
|-
|New Mexico
|The Mavericks
|Avengers: The Initiative #16
|Annex, Geiger, Jocasta, She-Thing (was revealed to be a Skrull infiltrator)
|-
|New York
|Avengers (Initiative)
|The Mighty Avengers #1
|Member List
|-
|North Carolina
|Unnamed group (formerly the U-Foes)
|Avengers: The Initiative #35
|Batwing, Butterball
|-
|Ohio
|Agents from A.R.M.O.R.
|Marvel Zombies 5 #2
|Howard the Duck, Machine Man, Swift Cloud, Hurricane
|-
|Oregon
|Force of Nature
|Avengers: The Initiative #26
|Member List
|-
|Pennsylvania
|The Liberteens
|Avengers: The Initiative Annual #1 
|Member List
|-
|Texas
|Rangers
|Civil War #7 (as Initiative team)
|Member List
|-
|Utah
|The Called
|Civil War #6
|Unnamed Mormon superheroes.
|-
|Vermont
|The Garrison
|Penance Relentless #3
|Fin, Man-Eater
|-
|Washington
|Earth Force
|Civil War: Frontline #12 (as Initiative team)
|Earth Lord, Skyhawk, Wind Warrior
|-
|Wisconsin
|Great Lakes Initiative
|Deadpool/GLI Summer Fun Spectacular (as Initiative team)
|Member List
|}

Details
 Cadets are trained in combat, search and rescue, power control, first aid, and superhuman ethics.
 The training that Initiative cadets undergo is structured like basic recruit training.
 Cadets are issued uniforms comprising palm gloves, traction boots and military fatigue cargo pants. A t-shirt with some kind of logo (often with the first letter of the cadet's codename) on it is provided if the cadet does not already have a costume. If the cadet has a secret identity, they are required to somehow conceal their identity (i.e. a mask, goggles, a helmet, shape-changing or some form of concealment).
 While the "Avengers Assemble!" battle cry is used by instructors and cadets in battle and many instructors and cadets are former or current members, being a recruit does not automatically award one membership in the Avengers. Use of the Avengers name is informal meant to act as an inspirational tool.

Collected editions

In other media
The Initiative was referenced in The Super Hero Squad Show'' episode "Tales of Suspense." War Machine tells Iron Man that he had to cover for him when handling the Initiative.

See also 
 Omega Flight

References

External links 
 Avengers: The Initiative #1 at Marvel.com
 Avengers: The Initiative #2 at Marvel.com
 Avengers: The Initiative #3 at Marvel.com

Comics by Christos Gage